RAPS or Raps  may refer to:
 Rapping, spoken or chanted rhyming lyrics
 Ram Air Progression System, a parachuting training method
 Remote-area power supply, an off-the-grid electricity system
 "Raps", a colloquial nickname for the Toronto Raptors
 Reducing and alkalinity producing system used for wastewater treatment